Bitter Flowers may refer to:
 Bitter Flowers (2007 film), a Norwegian crime thriller film
 Bitter Flowers (2017 film), a drama film directed by Olivier Meys